Barbastathis (Greek: Μπαρμπαστάθης) is the name of a Greek brand of frozen vegetables, owned today by CVC Capital Partners.

It was founded in 1969 in Thessaloniki by Giannis Michailidis from Drama.

In 1991 it entered the Athens Stock Exchange and in 1994 it was by bought by Delta dairy company (Daskalopoulos).

As of 2017 it is the leading brand of frozen vegetables, found mostly in Greek supermarkets. The company maintains a factory in the industrial area of Sindos, Thessaloniki.

Gallery

References

Sources
Ελληνική Βιομηχανία 

Companies based in Thessaloniki
Greek brands
Food and drink companies established in 1969
Frozen food brands
Greek companies established in 1969
Companies listed on the Athens Exchange
Vivartia
1994 mergers and acquisitions